Mister Quilp is a 1975 British musical film directed by Michael Tuchner and starring Anthony Newley, David Hemmings and Jill Bennett. It is based on the 1841 novel The Old Curiosity Shop by Charles Dickens, under which name it was also released.

Main cast
 Anthony Newley as Daniel Quilp 
 David Hemmings as Richard Swiveller 
 Jill Bennett as Sally Brass 
 Sarah-Jane Varley as Little Nell 
 Michael Hordern as  Grandfather / Edward Trent 
 David Warner as Sampson Brass
 Yvonne Antrobus as Betsy Quilp 
 Sue Barbour as Stiltdancer 
 David Battley as Codlin 
 Windsor Davies as George, Mrs. Jarley's asst. 
 Philip Davis as Tom Scott 
 Peter Duncan as Kit Nubbles 
 Brian Glover as Furnaceman 
 Chris Greener as Giant 
 Rosalind Knight as Mrs. George
 Ronald Lacey as Harris 
 Bryan Pringle as Mr. Garland 
 Paul Rogers as Single Gent / Henry Trent 
 Maxwell Shaw as Isaac List 
 Norman Warwick as Vuffin 
 Mona Washbourne as Mrs. Jarley 
 Malcolm Weaver as Acrobat 
 Sarah Webb as Duchess

Release
The film was one of several "Family Classics" made into modern musical films by Reader's Digest. Mr. Quilp was theatrically distributed by EMI Films in the United Kingdom and by Avco Embassy Pictures in the USA.

Home media
In the VHS and Beta formats, it was released by Magnetic Video under the title The Old Curiosity Shop, though this release was heavily edited down by roughly 30 minutes. Viewers in the UK have reported seeing it played on television in the 1980s. To date, the film has never been officially released on DVD.

Critical reception
Critic Roger Ebert gave the film a mixed review, praising the music and Newley's performance, but criticizing the decision to center the film around the titular evil money-lender and failing to make the story compelling enough to hold interest.

References

External links

1975 films
British historical musical films
Films scored by Elmer Bernstein
Films based on The Old Curiosity Shop
1970s historical musical films
Films directed by Michael Tuchner
Films shot at Pinewood Studios
Reader's Digest
Films set in London
Films set in the 19th century
Embassy Pictures films
1970s English-language films
1970s British films